John Henry Jacques, Baron Jacques (11 January 1905 – 20 December 1995) was a British businessman and politician for the Co-operative Party.

Background
Born in Ashington, he was the son of Thomas Dobsons Jacques, a miner and Ann Jaques, (née Bircham) A scholarship led him to the Co-operative College, located in Manchester, where he graduated with a Bachelor of Arts in commerce. He then went to Low Moorsley as a secretary-manager of its Co-operative Society in 1925.

Career
In 1929, Jacques became a tutor at his former school and from 1942 worked as an accountant for Plymouth's Co-op Society until 1945. He was subsequently chief executive of the Portsea Island Co-operative Society until 1965 and during this time served as President of the 1961 Co-operative Congress. From 1964, Jacques chaired the Co-operative Union, retiring after six years. In 1971, he became president of the Retail Trades Education Council, a post he held until 1975.

In recognition of his services to the Co-operative movement, on 11 July 1968  he received a life peerage with the title Baron Jacques, of Portsea Island, in the County of Hampshire, sitting as a Labour Co-operative peer. After some years in the House of Lords, Jacques was appointed a Lord-in-waiting in 1974, however was replaced three years later. In 1977, he became a Deputy Chairman of Committees until 1985. He served as Lord-in-Waiting again in 1979, shortly before Labour's defeat by the Conservative Party.

Family
Jacques and Constance White were married in 1929 and had two sons and a daughter. Constance died in 1987 and two years later Jacques married Violet Davies. He died at Portsmouth in 1995 and was survived by his second wife.

The Portsea Island Society's store in Fratton Road, Portsmouth is now a Wetherspoons pub and was named "The John Jacques" in his honour.

References

External links

1905 births
1995 deaths
British businesspeople in retailing
Jacques
Presidents of Co-operative Congress
Alumni of the Co-operative College
Life peers created by Elizabeth II